KOYA 88.1 FM is a Community radio station, owned and operated by the Rosebud Sioux Tribe. Licensed to Rosebud, South Dakota, the station serves the Rosebud Indian Reservation.

See also
List of community radio stations in the United States

References

External links
KOYA Facebook

Community radio stations in the United States
Native American radio
OYA
Rosebud Indian Reservation